Flight, or On the Run is a play by Mikhail Bulgakov. It is set during the end of the Russian Civil War, when the remnants of the White Army are desperately resisting the Red Army on the Crimean isthmus. The lives of the abandoned Serafima Korzukhina, the university professor Sergei Golubkov and the White generals Charnota and Khludov are closely intertwined.

Written in 1927, the play was rehearsed but never allowed to be performed during Bulgakov's lifetime, as the authorities felt that it glorified the Whites. It wasn't played until 1957, 17 years after Bulgakov's death.

The play's English premiere was at the Bristol Old Vic Theatre in 1972, directed by Val May.

The play is the basis for the film The Flight, which premiered in 1970.

In 1972 Valentin Bibik composed the opera Flight, op.12/45, based on the play. Final 1996  version of the opera was premiered in 2010 in Kyiv Philharmonic hall under conductor Roman Kofman.

References

External links
interview  with Victoria Bibik by Yulia BENTIA, special to The Day, Kyiv, Ukraine
, the Kyiv National Philharmonic orchestra under the baton of Roman Kofman

Plays by Mikhail Bulgakov
1927 plays
Satirical plays
Russian plays